Trackinsight is a privately held financial technology company headquartered in Biot, France.

History 
Trackinsight was founded in 2014 by Jean-René Giraud, co-founder and board member of Koris International.

The platform spun off from Koris International on October 17, 2016, when Trackinsight raised €2,500,000 from NewAlpha Asset Management and Aviva Group.

As of June 2021, the firm operates as a global group with over 30 professionals based in New York, Toronto, London, Geneva, Paris, Amsterdam and Biot where the company was founded.

Products and Services

Global View 
Trackinsight’s Global View is flagship data offering that covers over 7,000 ETFs listed worldwide. North American clients can access Global View from Trackinsight’s distribution partner, Nasdaq.

Global ETF Survey 
Trackinsight releases an annual global survey with professional investors highlighting activity in the ETF space. The Global ETF Survey 2021 supported by IHS Markit and J.P. Morgan Asset Management polled 373 professional investors from 18 countries who oversee a total of $347 billion in ETF assets and more than half having over 40% of their total portfolio invested in ETFs.

ESG Investing Platform 
In January 2021, Trackinsight launched an ESG investing platform, called the ESG Observatory. The ESG investing platform was developed in partnership with independent ESG verifier Conser, and with support from the SDG Investors Partnership of the United Nations Conference on Trade and Development.

The platform’s features include key ESG investment trends, comparison of the different ESG strategies offered by ETF issuers and measurement of which funds are contributing most towards meeting the United Nations Sustainable Development Goals.

Thematic Investing Platform 
On October 22nd, 2021 Trackinsight launched a new classification system for thematic ETFs with support from Legal & General Investment Management and ROBO Global.

Fixed Income Investing Platform 
In February 2022, by collaborating with iShares and Jane Street, Trackinsight launched the Fixed Income Investing hub to build a comprehensive research and analysis portal dedicated to fixed income investing.

Technology Services 
Trackinsight provides tools, data and analytics for institutions in the ETF industry.

Death of Jean-René Giraud  
Trackinsight CEO Jean-René Giraud died on June 16, 2022.

See also 
 Exchange-traded fund
 Financial technology
Investing
Environmental, social and corporate governance

Notes and references 

Financial services companies established in 2014
Online financial services companies of France